Harrison Tembo (born 21 January 1969) is a Zambian footballer. He played in five matches for the Zambia national football team from 1994 to 1998. He was also named in Zambia's squad for the 1994 African Cup of Nations tournament.

References

1969 births
Living people
Zambian footballers
Zambia international footballers
1994 African Cup of Nations players
Place of birth missing (living people)
Association football midfielders